Jack Lawless (born September 20, 1987) is an American musician and singer. He is the drummer for the bands DNCE and Ocean Grove, as well as a live drummer for the Jonas Brothers. He grew up in Middletown Township, New Jersey, part of Monmouth County.

Career

Music
Lawless has performed with the Jonas Brothers since 2006.

In 2008, Lawless played the drums on Demi Lovato's debut album Don't Forget.

He is the drummer for the band DNCE (with Joe Jonas as lead singer) which debuted in 2015.

Jonas Brothers
The Jonas Brothers' backing band included Ryan Liestman on keyboards, John Taylor on guitar, Greg Garbowsky on bass and himself on drums.

References

1987 births
American drummers
Jonas Brothers members
Living people
People from Middletown Township, New Jersey
DNCE members
21st-century American drummers